Marcelo Filippini (born 4 August 1967) is a former professional tennis player from Uruguay.

In 1996, Filippini played what was longest known game in ATP Tour history at Casablanca, going to deuce 20 times with Alberto Berasategui in one game of a 6–2, 6–3 first round loss. The game lasted 28 minutes.

Filippini's best performance at a Grand Slam event came at the French Open in 1999, where he reached (as a qualifier without dropping a set) the quarterfinals, defeating Laurence Tieleman, Martin Damm, Vince Spadea and Greg Rusedski before being knocked-out by eventual champion Andre Agassi. He also reached the quarterfinals of the 1993 Rome Masters.

Career finals

Singles: 10 (5 wins – 5 losses)

Doubles: 5 (3 wins – 2 losses)

External links 
 
 
 

Olympic tennis players of Uruguay
Sportspeople from Montevideo
Tennis players at the 1996 Summer Olympics
Uruguayan male tennis players
Uruguayan sportspeople of Italian descent
1967 births
Living people
South American Games medalists in tennis
South American Games gold medalists for Uruguay
South American Games bronze medalists for Uruguay
Competitors at the 1986 South American Games
20th-century Uruguayan people